BeIA, or BeOS for Internet Appliances, was a minimized version of Be Inc.'s BeOS operating system for embedded systems.

The BeIA system presents a browser-based interface to the user. The browser was based on the Opera 4.0 code base, but most of times it featured built-in dashboard (like Sony eVilla), and was named Wagner. Unlike the BeOS, which runs the Tracker and Deskbar at boot-up, the BeIA OS boots straight into the Opera browser interface (only on Compaq IA-1, similar to the later Google ChromeOS does with the Google Chrome browser). While it is possible to boot BeIA into an interface similar to the standard BeOS, doing so involves special knowledge.

BeIA compression techniques
The BeIA operating system employs a number of techniques to minimise the system footprint. These involve a number of pre processes which yield an installable file system image.

The CFS Filesystem was used to reduce the file system size. CFS (Compressed File System) was a file system created in house at Be Inc that aimed to compress the files within itself to save space. The filesystem had a similar set of properties to the native BeOS file system BFS, but some of the more advanced features (live queries and attributes) were either broken or non-functional in many of the Beta releases of the software.

The BeOS uses ELF format executable files, much as many other operating systems. BeIA uses an extended version of ELF, the name of which is unknown but which has come to be known as CELF, from the CEL magic word within the executable header and the fact that it is derived from ELF format executables through a compression process. The CELF (Compressed ELF) files use a patented technique to compress the op codes within the executable and reduce the overall footprint of each executable file. The file was compressed by creating a set of dictionaries that contain the op codes and are read by the kernel at start up and mapped into the executable in memory at run time. This makes the file fast loading, but has an extreme disadvantage, in that the dictionary is not extendible by the user and adding extra executable was not possible when using CELF compression techniques unless the executable symbols existed within the dictionary already present. The creation of CELF executables is generally done in batch. The entire system will be compressed and a file system image created from the crushed files.
 
Crushing was the term coined for the compression of the system using CELF format. BeIA can run either as CELF or ELF based. However, it can only use one or the other file formats.

Versions
The following BeIA versions were released to developers at stages of the development of the system.
  Pre 1.0 build - reports to be 4.5.2, this is likely a hang over from the BeOS version. Pre numbering of BeIA.
 1.0 beta 9 (uncrushed binaries are compatible with Release Candidate)
 1.0 Release Candidate (circa the clipper)
 1.0
 2.0

History
BeIA is believed by many to be partially responsible for the death of Be, Inc., as sales were never anywhere near as high as anticipated.

During 2001, a Zanussi "internet fridge" toured the US with a BeIA powered DT-300 webpad docked in its door.

List of BeIA devices
 Sony eVilla - sold as a home web terminal with BeIA preloaded
 Compaq IA-1 - sold with either BeIA or MSN Companion.
 HARP - not a computer, but a standard for audio streaming terminals, used by Virgin in some of their stores
 Proview iPAD (PI-520B)
 DT Research DT-300 (NB. DT-325 was used with later 2.0 betas)
 Hardware known to run BeIA (official and unofficial)

See also
 BeOS
 BeIA Product overview
 BeIA FAQ
 BeIA DataSheet
 BeIA browser tests
 Link discussing BeIA technical terminology
 DT300 and BeIA hacking discussion.

References

External links
  (BeIA)
 BeIA Demo

BeOS
Embedded operating systems
Information appliances
Opera Software
X86 operating systems